Nguyen Manh Khanh (1934 in Hanoi – June 30, 2016 in Ho Chi Minh City), also known as Quasar Khanh, was a Vietnamese engineer, an inventor, and a designer. The Vietnamese and French community significantly recognizes him for his inflatable furniture line Aerospace. At the age of fifteen, Khanh moved to Paris, and established himself as the most significant Vietnamese furniture designer of the 20th century. He was one of a handful of designers whose shocking products, in color and in form, were in touch with the renegade spirit of the 1960s.

Biography 

During Khanh’s early adulthood he studied engineering at the National School of Bridges and Roads (1955-1958) in Paris. There, he met the beautiful and talented French fashion designer Emmanuelle. They married in 1957 and later had their daughter Atlantic Khanh. In this same year Nguyen Manh Khanh began going by the name Quasar Khanh, before he started his career in design. Before his death he moved back to Vietnam, Ho Chi Minh City.

Works 

Right out of school Khanh practiced engraining with Estrees Viduct. Before Khanh designed his first solo product of an inner city car, he worked in Quebec on the Manicouagan dam over the course of two years (1958-1960).

In 1964, Khanh invented a car called the Quasar-Unipower or the Cube. This was manufactured for two years by the British firm Unipower in 1967-1969. A year before The Cube went into manufacturing Khanh started designing his first and only 11-piece inflatable furniture collection, Aerospace. Aerospace went into manufacturing in 1969 at Khanh’s very own manufacturing company. Today, the company Fugu Furniture, located in Puteaux, France, now produces the Aerospace line.

Khanh’s inflatable furniture was a durable PVC and could withstand the rigorous activities of everyday life when not exposed to sharp objects, high heat, or to cigarette burns. For the time of this line of furniture, people wanted to “better themselves” by trying new things and living a life of leisure. These pieces of furniture were youthful, fashionable, and highly desired among the pop culture, yet they were designed with a form of tradition. In 1969, an inflatable chair advertisement referred to the furniture as ‘space age comfort’.

Over the years, Khanh added a line of sand molded aluminum cast furniture, and produced the Khanh Hydrair KX1 and QuasArk Q2 boat prototypes and a bamboo bicycle called bambooclette.

He continued to design a variety of problem solving solutions late into his life before his death in Ho Chi Minh City on June 30, 2016.

References 

 Blow Up - Quasar Khanh's Inflatable Furniture – Voices of East Anglia. 2013 [cited 10/13 2015]. Available fromhttp://www.voicesofeastanglia.com/2013/07/quasar-khanh-inflatable-furniture.html.
 Luxury Furniture Vietnam: Vietnam's most famous furniture designer: Quasar Khanh. 2007 [cited 10/13 2015]. Available fromhttp://luxury-furniture-vietnam.com/designer-furniture/quasar-khanh-vietnamese-furniture-designer/.
 Anonymous  Site official de Quasar Khanh: Pioneer of inflatable Furniture. a [cited 10/13 2015]. Available from
 The Inflatable Furniture Origins. b [cited 9/15 2015]. Available from
Quasar Khanh: Law Collection Aerospace 1968. c [cited 9/15 2015]. Available from
Michel, Albin. Galerie 47: Quasar Khanh. [cited 10/13 2015]. Available from
 V&A's. Armchair. 2015 [cited 10/13 2015]. Available fromhttp://collections.vam.ac.uk/item/O147463/armchair-khanh-quasar/.
Viet, Ha. 2011. Aluminum Cast Furniture by Qussar Khanh. Tuoitre News.
 Whiteley, Nigel. 1987. Semi-Works of Art: Consumersim, Youth Culture and Chair Design in the 1960s. Furniture History 23, 116.
 Zesiger, Carey. 1999. A Designer Back in Vietnam. New York Times Style,.

Vietnamese artists
1934 births
2016 deaths